The Houston Gamblers are a professional American football team based in Houston, Texas. The Gamblers compete in the United States Football League (USFL) as a member club of the South division, and play their home games at Simmons Bank Liberty Stadium in Memphis, Tennessee.

History 
The Houston Gamblers were one of eight teams that were officially announced as a USFL franchise on The Herd with Colin Cowherd on November 22, 2021. On January 6, 2022, it was announced on The Herd with Colin Cowherd that former NCAA Football Head coach Kevin Sumlin was named the Head coach and General manager of the Gamblers. Houston is the only city in the USFL nominally based west of the Mississippi River and the only team that has a representative team in both professional spring football leagues, the USFL (the Gamblers) and the XFL (the Houston Roughnecks), though the Gamblers have never set foot in Houston, instead playing as a traveling team under the USFL's hub model. 

On January 6, 2022, from college head coach, Kevin Sumlin was named the head coach and general manager for the Houston Gamblers. The Gamblers' first season game was on April 17, 2002 against the Michigan Panthers at Protective Stadium in Birmingham, Alabama. Kicker Nick Vogel made a 37-yard field goal in the first quarter (the first points for the franchise). The Gamblers defeated the Panthers 17–12, winning their first game in franchise history. The Gamblers lost their next seven games before winning for their final two games of the season, and failing to qualify for the USFL playoffs.

In September, 2022, the Gamblers announced that Robert Morris was named their new general manager. In November of 2022, the USFL announced that the Gamblers will play at Simmons Bank Liberty Stadium in Memphis, Tennessee for the 2023 season. In February, 2023, Sumlin announced his plans to join the coaching staff of the Maryland Terrapins, this lead to the Gamblers hiring former New Orleans Saints assistant coach, Curtis Johnson as their new head coach.

Players of note

Current roster 
Initially, each team carried a 38-man active roster and a 7-man practice squad, but the rosters were increased to 40 active players and 50 total in May, 2022.

USFL Defensive Player of the Year award winners

Staff and head coaches

Head coaches

Statistics and records

Season-by-season record

Note: The Finish, Wins, Losses, and Ties columns list regular season results and exclude any postseason play.

Records

References 

2021 establishments in Alabama
American football teams established in 2021
Houston Gamblers (2022)
American football teams in Birmingham, Alabama
United States Football League (2022) teams